Patricia Gabbey Gensel (born March 18, 1944) is an American botanist and paleobotanist.

Life
Gensel was born in Buffalo, New York, and attended Hope College in Holland, Michigan, earning a B.A. in 1966. She obtained her Ph.D. in 1972 from the University of Connecticut. As of 2011, Gensel was on the faculty of the Biology Department of the University of North Carolina at Chapel Hill.

Gensel is noted for her research on Paleozoic plants. She served as president of the Botanical Society of America for 2000–2001. Gensel is the namesake of the genus, Genselia Knaus, which consists of four species of early Carboniferous plants found in the Pocono and Price Formations in the Appalachian Basin of North America.

Publications

References

American paleontologists
Paleobotanists
1944 births
Living people
American women botanists
Women paleontologists
Botanical Society of America
Botanists with author abbreviations
University of North Carolina at Chapel Hill faculty
Hope College alumni
University of Connecticut alumni
Scientists from Buffalo, New York
20th-century American botanists
21st-century American botanists
20th-century American women scientists
21st-century American women scientists
American women academics